Robert Yardley may refer to:

 Robert Morris Yardley (1850–1902), member of the U.S. House of Representatives from Pennsylvania
 Robert Blake Yardley (1858–1943),  British barrister and philatelist